Peterborough Town Cricket Club is part of City of Peterborough Sports Club based at Dalrod Sports Ground, Bretton, Peterborough, Cambridgeshire, England. Peterborough Town have two senior Saturday XI teams in the Northamptonshire Cricket League, a 3rd XI team in the Huntingdonshire County Cricket League, two Sunday XI teams in the Rutland and District Cricket League, and an established Junior Section, who play in the Higham & District Youth League.

Ground
Peterborough Town's 1st and 2nd XI play their home matches at the Dalrod Sports Ground, Bretton, and the 3rd XI use the Thomas Deacon Academy, Queen's Gardens, Peterborough. In 2005 they were one of the 1st clubs in the country to receive Clubmark accreditation from the ECB. The club was re-accredited in 2019. A brand new electronic scoreboard was installed at the start of the 2018 season, and a two lane artificial net practice facility that was laid at the start of the 2009 season was refurbished in 2020.

History
Competing in the Northamptonshire County Cricket League, Peterborough Town became League Champions as early as 1956, and continued to achieve further successes in the league up to the late 1990s. 1970 saw the formation of the Peterborough Town Cricket, Hockey & Squash Club Ltd (now known as the City of Peterborough Sports Club). The club was formed by an amalgamation of Peterborough Town Cricket Club and Peterborough Town Hockey Club, formerly based at Crawthorne Road, and the City & Counties Squash Club formerly based in Priestgate. Up until 1971 Peterborough Town Cricket Club was based at Crawthorne Road in the city centre but then relocated to Bretton Gate, presently known as the Dalrod Sports Ground. By 1999, the Northamptonshire Cricket League, as it is now known, was designated an ECB Premier League, and Peterborough Town is one of only three cricket clubs (Finedon Dolben, Old Northamptonians and Peterborough Town) to have held a constant presence in the highest level of competition for recreational club cricket in Northamptonshire, with five ECB Premiership league championship titles to their name. Peterborough Town also maintain a significant presence in the regional Sunday cricket league, the Rutland and District Cricket League, and they have achieved seven League Championship titles since 2010.

Beyond League activity, Peterborough Town attracted national attention when they became a group champion in the ECB National Club Cricket Championship in 2018. High Wycombe just needed three runs to win, off the final two overs, but Peterborough Town miraculously took seven wickets in 11 balls to win the Group Championship.

Club Performance
The Northamptonshire Cricket League competition results showing the club's positions in the league (by Division) since 2003.

Source: Northamptonshire Cricket League

The Huntingdonshire County Cricket League competition results showing the club's positions in the league (by Division) since 2011.

Source: Huntingdonshire County Cricket League 

The Rutland and District Cricket League competition results showing the club's positions in the league (by Division) since 2000.

Source: Rutland and District Cricket League

Club Honours

Source:

References

External links 
 Cricket collapse: Peterborough Town take seven High Wycombe wickets in 11 balls (2018)
 PTCC are East Midlands T20 champions! (2013)
 Peterborough Town CC - Youtube
 Play Cricket

English club cricket teams
Cricket in Cambridgeshire